Ginger Pye is a book by Eleanor Estes about a dog named Ginger Pye. The book was originally published in 1951, and it won the Newbery Medal for excellence in American children's literature in 1952.

Plot summary
This book is about a puppy named Ginger. Jerry Pye, a resident in Cranbury, Connecticut in 1919, bought a puppy he wanted from Ms. Speedy for a hard-earned dollar he made while dusting the pews in the church for Sam Doody. Jerry was pleased with the puppy and headed home. On the way home, Jerry and his sister Rachel heard footsteps behind them. When they turned back, they did not see anything. Jerry decided that if anyone was following them, then that follower was after his dog. After a few days, Jerry remembered that he hadn't given his puppy a name! He asked his mother and his mother said Ginger because he is the color of ginger and has a gingery temperament. So they called him Ginger or Ginger Pye. Ginger was a smart dog.  He even located the school that Jerry goes to.  Almost all his neighbors and friends knew Ginger.

Ginger Pye went missing on Thanksgiving Day. Jerry and his sister Rachel searched for the puppy all around Cranbury but could not find him.  They discover Ginger tied up in a shed, and uncover the identity of the thief: Wally Bullwinkle. The book closes with Ginger home safe to a happy family.

Sequel
Pinky Pye is a 1958 book by Eleanor Estes, the sequel to Ginger Pye. In this book, the eponymous black kitten is adopted by the Pyes during their summer vacation on Fire Island.

1951 American novels
American children's novels
Newbery Medal–winning works
Dogs in literature
Novels set in Connecticut
Novels set in New York (state)
Children's novels about animals
Fictional dogs
1951 children's books